Matthew Rose (born 4 May 1978 in Seaford, near Brighton, UK) is an English operatic bass.

Biography
Matthew Rose studied at Seaford College and the Curtis Institute of Music, Philadelphia. In 2003 he joined the Young Artists Programme at the Royal Opera House, Covent Garden.

He has performed at many of the most noted operatic venues across the world including La Scala, Milan, The Royal Opera House, Covent Garden, Glyndebourne, the Metropolitan Opera, New York and English National Opera.

He has sung most of the standard oratorio repertoire in concert, working with orchestras such as the London Symphony Orchestra, the Orchestra dell'Accademia Nazionale di Santa Cecilia, the BBC Symphony Orchestra, the Los Angeles Philharmonic, the Tonhalle Orchester Zürich, The Monteverdi Choir, the Dresden Staatskapelle, the London Philharmonic Orchestra, the Vienna Symphony Orchestra, the Scottish Chamber Orchestra, the Orchestra of the Age of Enlightenment and the City of Birmingham Symphony Orchestra.

He has performed at the BBC Proms, The Edinburgh Festival, The Georges Enescu Festival and the Mostly Mozart Festival, New York and has given recitals at venues such as the Wigmore Hall and the Concertgebouw, Amsterdam. He was awarded the John Christie Prize at Glyndebourne in 2006 and received the Independent Opera/Wigmore Hall Fellowship in 2007. In June 2012 he was awarded the Critics Circle Award for Exceptional Young Talent.

Operatic repertoire
 
Doctor in Vanessa by Barber
Don Fernando in Fidelio by Beethoven
Zuniga in Carmen by Bizet
Claggart, Lieutenant Ratcliffe & Mr Flintin Billy Budd by Britten
Abbott in Curlew River by Britten
Bottom in A Midsummer Night's Dream by Britten
Noye in Noye's Fludde by Britten
Swallow in Peter Grimes by Britten
Collatinus in The Rape of Lucretia by Britten
Raimondo in Lucia di Lammermoor by Donizetti 
Talbot in Maria Stuarda by Donizetti
Albert in La Juive by Halévy
Haraschta in The Cunning Little Vixen by Janáček
Seneca in L'incoronazione di Poppea by Monteverdi
Speaker & Sarastro in The Magic Flute by Mozart 
Leporello in Don Giovanni by Mozart 
Publio in La clemenza di Tito by Mozart
Title role in The Marriage of Figaro by Mozart
Crespel in The Tales of Hoffmann by Offenbach
Colline in La bohème by Puccini
Don Basilio in The Barber of Seville by Rossini
Truffaldino in Ariadne auf Naxos by Strauss
Tutor in Elektra by Strauss
Tiresias in Oedipus Rex by Stravinsky
Nick Shadow in The Rake's Progress by Stravinsky
Gremin in Yevgeny Onegin by Tchaikovsky
Il re in Aida by Verdi
Monk in Don Carlos by Verdi
Pistola in Falstaff by Verdi
Lodovico in Otello by Verdi
Tom in Un ballo in maschera by Verdi
Pogner in Die Meistersinger von Nürnberg by Wagner 
Fasolt in Das Rheingold by Wagner
Claudio in Agrippina by Handel

Recordings
He has recorded with Sir Colin Davis (Berlioz L'enfance du Christ, Otello and a Child of our Time for LSO Live), Sir Charles Mackerras (Mozart Vespers and Schubert Mass in E flat with Dresden Staatskappelle) and  Richard Hickox (Schubert Mass in E flat); Ariadne auf Naxos with Sir Richard Armstrong, Rossini's Stabat Mater with LPO and  Yannick Nézet-Séguin,  Tristan and Isolde and William Tell with Antonio Pappano, A Midsummer Night's Dream by Britten with Ilan Volkov from Glyndebourne, Billy Budd with Daniel Harding (winner Grammy award), Messiah with King's College, Cambridge (also on DVD) and a CD of Liszt songs with Iain Burnside. On DVD he can be seen in Carmen, Faust and Acis and Galatea from the Royal Opera House, Billy Budd and The Rake's Progress from Glyndebourne and Haydn's Creation with John Nelson and the Netherlands Radio Chamber Orchestra. In 2013 he released his début solo recital disc, Schubert's Winterreise, with pianist Gary Matthewman, for Stone Records.

References

1978 births
Living people
People educated at Seaford College
English basses
Operatic basses
English opera singers
People from Brighton
Curtis Institute of Music alumni
21st-century English singers
21st-century British male singers